HD 187085 b is an extrasolar planet discovered in 2006 by a team led by Hugh Jones. HD 187085 b orbits its star in a highly eccentric orbit. The discovery was made as part of the Anglo-Australian Planet Search.

Their interpretation of the data set the eccentricity at 0.47. Using a statistical computer program, another team reinterpreted the same data for a lower eccentricity of 0.33.

See also
 HD 188015 b
 HD 20782 b

References

External links
 
 

Sagittarius (constellation)
Exoplanets detected by radial velocity
Exoplanets discovered in 2006
Giant planets